Abbas Babaei (5 December 1950 – 6 August 1987) was an Iranian pilot and brigadier-general in the Islamic Republic of Iran Air Force (IRIAF), during the Iran-Iraq War.

Education
He was born in a middle class religious family in Qazvin in 1950. Babaei was a student at Dehkhoda primary school and graduated from Nezam Vafa high school. After graduating in 1969 he moved to the United States to become a fighter pilot. During his studies in the U.S. he was chosen as the volleyball captain of the airbase volleyball team.

Return to Iran
After returning to Iran following flight training, he became a pilot on the Northrop F-5 fighter aircraft. After returning to Iran he married his cousin Maliheh and moved to Dezful in Khuzestan Province where he resided in the Iranian Air Force residence. He had three children, a daughter, Salma, and two sons, Hossein and Mohammad.

The Iran-Iraq war
He became the commander of the 8th Tactical Air Base in 1981. Aviation journalist and Iran-Iraq air war expert Tom Cooper reports that Babaei was "notorious for his merciless treatment of the pilots and officers" considered disloyal to the new regime. Cooper's research indicates:
... Col. Abbas Baba’ie, an officer differently described as the "mastermind of IRIAF’s capability to keep its F-14-fleet intact", or simply a "war hero". There are, however, numerous former IRIAF pilots who not only deny that Baba’ie ever even qualified on F-14s, but also outright refuse to even mention his name, most likely because of his close cooperation with the clerical regime in Tehran.
But it is a fact that he really is popular among people because of his achievements during the Iran and Iraq war

Death

General Abbas Babaei was killed on 6 August 1987, while in the rear seat of an F-5B while over Iraqi air space. He was hit by a 23 mm round of an air defense system on Sardasht air space, a city located in west Azerbaijan, Iran. It turned out an Iranian' defense system, operated by Sepah, had hit Babaei's aircraft in error. The pilot, Major Ali Mohammad Naderi managed to land the jet, but Babaei died within 10 minutes. Sepah used the ZSU-23 self-propelled, radar guided anti-aircraft weapon system (SPAAG) at the time.

In 2011, Flying Passion was shown on Channel 1. The film was about Babaei's lifetime.

The memory of Babayi, who earned shahid ("martyr") status for his untimely death, is preserved in the name of Shahid Babaee High School (Qazvin Sampad), his commemorative statute in Qazvin (shown at right), and in Tehran's Babayi Expressway.

References

1987 deaths
1950 births
People from Qazvin
Islamic Republic of Iran Air Force personnel
Islamic Republic of Iran Army brigadier generals
Iranian military personnel killed in the Iran–Iraq War
Military personnel killed by friendly fire
Islamic Republic of Iran Army personnel of the Iran–Iraq War